The surname מענדעלסאן is transliterated to English as Mendelssohn, Mendelsson, or Mendelson. It is a common Polish/German Jewish surname. The variant spellings are used interchangeably, often even within a single family.

The name means son of Mendel ("Mendel's son"), or son of Menachem, as Mendel is a Yiddish diminutive  of the Hebrew given name Menahem.  Menachem itself means "consoling" or "one who consoles".

People

Mendelssohn
 Mendelssohn family
Moses Mendelssohn (1729–1786), philosopher, a significant figure in the Age of Enlightenment in Germany, and his descendants:
 Joseph Mendelssohn (1770–1848), German Jewish banker, son of Moses, founder of Mendelssohn & Co.
 Abraham Mendelssohn Bartholdy (1776–1835), German Jewish banker, son of Moses, father of Fanny and Felix
 Brendel Mendelssohn (1763–1839), daughter of Moses, married (i) Simon Veit, (ii) Friedrich Schlegel
 Fanny Mendelssohn (1805–1847), noted early Romantic composer and pianist, daughter of Abraham
 Felix Mendelssohn Bartholdy (1809–1847), noted early Romantic composer, son of Abraham
 Rebecka Mendelssohn (1811–1858), daughter of Abraham, married Peter Gustav Lejeune Dirichlet (1805–1859), mathematician
 Paul Mendelssohn Bartholdy (1841–1880), chemist, son of Felix
 Arnold Mendelssohn (1855–1933), great-grandson of Moses, German composer and music teacher
 Anna Mendelssohn (1948–2009), British political activist and poet
 Carol Mendelsohn (born 1951), American TV writer
 Daniel Mendelsohn (born 1960), American author and classics scholar
 Felix Bartholdy Mendelssohn (1911–1952), British band leader
 George Mendelssohn, founder of Vox Records in 1945
 Heinrich Mendelssohn (1881–1959), German building tycoon
 Kurt Mendelssohn (1906–1980), German-born British medical physicist
 Vladimir Mendelssohn (1949–2021), Romanian composer, violist, and professor

Mendelsohn
 Ben Mendelsohn (born 1969), Australian actor and musician
Carolyn Mendelsohn, English photographer
 Erich Mendelsohn (1887–1953), Prussian architect
 Fred Mendelsohn (1917–2000), US promoter of black gospel music, president of Savoy Records
 Jonathan Mendelsohn, Baron Mendelsohn (born 1966), British lobbyist and Labour political organiser
 Matthew Mendelsohn (birthdate unknown), Canadian civil servant 
 Nathan Mendelsohn (1917–2006), Canadian mathematician
 Nicola Mendelsohn (born 1971), British advertising executive
 Robert S. Mendelsohn (1926–1988), pediatrician and critic of medical paternalism

Mendelson
 Curtis Lester Mendelson (1913–2002), American cardiologist who first described the pneumonia called Mendelson's syndrome
 Elliott Mendelson (1931–2020), an American logician, famous for Mendelson axiom schemata for propositional Logic
 Mira Mendelson (1914–1968), Russian poet, second wife of Sergei Prokofiev
Paul Mendelson, scriptwriter for television, film and radio
 Phil Mendelson (born 1952), Washington, D.C., politician
Shari Mendelson (born 1961), American sculptor.

Other spellings
Ben Mandelson  (born 1953), English world musician
Peter Mandelson (born 1953), British Labour politician
Nathan Menderson (1820–1904), German-born American business executive and baseball executive

See also
Mandel
Menachem Mendel
Mendelssohn (disambiguation)

Jewish surnames
Surnames
Yiddish-language surnames